Belvaux is a surname. Notable people with the surname include:

Jean Belvaux (1894–1955), Belgian cyclist
Lucas Belvaux (born 1961), Belgian actor and film director
Rémy Belvaux (1967–2006), Belgian actor, director, producer, and screenwriter